HD 114386 is a 9th magnitude star located approximately 91 light years away in the constellation of Centaurus. It is an orange dwarf, and rather dim compared to the Sun. It can be seen with a telescope or good binoculars.

In 2004, the Geneva Extrasolar Planet Search Team announced the discovery of an extrasolar planet orbiting the star.

See also 
 47 Ursae Majoris
 List of extrasolar planets

References

External links 

K-type main-sequence stars
114386
064295
Centaurus (constellation)
Planetary systems with two confirmed planets
Durchmusterung objects